Edhi Handoko (August 28, 1960 – February 17, 2009) was an Indonesian chess player. He won the Indonesian Chess Championship in 1978, 1980, 1984 and 1991. Handoko earned the National Master title in 1978, before progressing to both FIDE Master and International Master in 1982. He subsequently became Indonesia's fourth grandmaster in 1994 with an Elo rating of 2520.
In 2003 he won the men's masters tournament at the inaugural Japfa Chess Festival in Jakarta. Handoko played in the Indonesian national team in the Chess Olympiad and the Asian Team Chess Championship.

Handoko died at the age of 48 on February 17, 2009 at the Cibinong Hospital in Bogor, following a heart attack.

References

External links 

1960 births
2009 deaths
Chess grandmasters
Indonesian chess players
Place of birth missing
Southeast Asian Games bronze medalists for Indonesia
Southeast Asian Games medalists in chess
Competitors at the 2005 Southeast Asian Games
20th-century chess players
20th-century Indonesian people
21st-century Indonesian people